McKinley Field  is a privately owned,public-use airport located four miles (6 km) south of the central business district of Pearsall, in Frio County, Texas, United States. It is privately owned by Aerial LLC, and is managed by Ike and Nathan McKinley.

Facilities and aircraft 
For the 12-month period ending March 18, 2005, the airport had 3,900 aircraft operations, 100% of which were general aviation.

References

External links 

Airports in Texas
Transportation in Frio County, Texas
Buildings and structures in Frio County, Texas